Tangail Stadium also called Tangail Zila Stadium is located at Club Road, north side of Bhashani Hall and Tangail Eid-gah, 200 metres away and west side of Shaheed Sriti Poura Uddan in the district of Tangail, Bangladesh. It is a multipurpose stadium. football,  Cricket, concerts and cultural programs take place here. Until 2013 the stadium was the home ground of Team BJMC which played in Bangladesh Premier League Football. It is the 3rd biggest stadium in Dhaka division

Football
Different local teams play among each other and it's a venue of inter district football matches. National football also played here from 2014.

Cricket
The stadium is used mostly for cricket, the most popular sport in Bangladesh. The stadium has become a venue of inter district cricket events as well as local events.

See also
 Stadiums in Bangladesh
 List of football stadiums in Bangladesh
 List of cricket grounds in Bangladesh
 Tangail Bus Stand, Mohakhali
 Tangail Railway Station

References

Sport in Bangladesh
Sports venues in Bangladesh
Cricket grounds in Bangladesh
Bangladeshi culture
Football venues in Bangladesh
Tangail District
Tangail City